Södertälje Municipality (Södertälje kommun) is a municipality in Stockholm County in east central Sweden. Its seat is located in the city of Södertälje.

It borders to Lake Mälaren in the north and the Baltic Sea in the south, and within the Stockholm County to Nykvarn Municipality and Salem Municipality and also border Södermanland County and its municipals Gnesta and Trosa.

The municipality was created 1967–1971 through the amalgamation of the former City of Södertälje with large rural and suburban areas surrounding it. In 1999, it was split when a new entity, Nykvarn Municipality, was detached from Södertälje Municipality.

Economy
Two big industries dominate Södertälje. Scania AB is a world leading manufacturer of trucks and busses and employed over 9,000 people. AstraZeneca is an international manufacturer of drugs (medicine) employing over 3,000 people. The municipal Södertälje itself employs over 5,600 people including teachers and people working with elderly people.

Södertälje has a canal, Södertälje Canal, that is very important for the ships who want to reach the big lake Mälaren from the Baltic Sea.

Demography
Södertälje has the fifth largest number of Finnish-speaking Sweden Finns in Sweden: 11,000, or around 13 per cent of the city population. Thus, taken together, Finns and Estimated 120,000 Assyrians in Sweden and account for 40 per cent of the inhabitants of the city.

Population development

Localities
Gnesta (minor part of)
Hölö
Järna
Mölnbo
Södertälje (seat)

Elections

Riksdag
These are the local results of the Riksdag elections since the 1972 municipality reform. The results of the Sweden Democrats were not published by SCB between 1988 and 1998 at a municipal level to the party's small nationwide size at the time. "Votes" denotes valid votes, whereas "Turnout" denotes also blank and invalid votes.

Blocs

This lists the relative strength of the socialist and centre-right blocs since 1973, but parties not elected to the Riksdag are inserted as "other", including the Sweden Democrats results from 1988 to 2006, but also the Christian Democrats pre-1991 and the Greens in 1982, 1985 and 1991. The sources are identical to the table above. The coalition or government mandate marked in bold formed the government after the election. New Democracy got elected in 1991 but are still listed as "other" due to the short lifespan of the party. "Elected" is the total number of percentage points from the municipality that went to parties who were elected to the Riksdag.

Notable people
 Björn Borg, former tennis player
 Johan Edlund, singer and leader of the bands Tiamat and Lucyfire
 Tom Wandell, NHL Player

International relations

The municipality is twinned with:

  Struer Municipality, Denmark
  Pärnu, Estonia
  Forssa, Finland
  Angers, France
  Sarpsborg, Norway

References

External links

Södertälje Municipality - Official site

 
Municipalities of Stockholm County